Emma Larkin is the pseudonym of an American journalist. Born and raised in Asia, and studied the Burmese language at the School of Oriental and African Studies in London.

Larkin covers Asia from her base in Bangkok. She has been visiting Burma for close to ten years. Here she covers the military dictatorship that rules the country.  She is known for her coverage of Burma and George Orwell's experience within it in her memoir, Finding George Orwell in Burma.

Works
 Comrade Aeon’s Field Guide to Bangkok, 2021.
 No Bad News for the King: The True Story of Cyclone Nargis and Its Aftermath in Burma, 2011.
 Everything is Broken: The Untold Story of Disaster Under Burma's Military Regime, 2010.
 Secret Histories: Finding George Orwell in a Burmese Tea Shop, 2005.

Finding George... won the Borders Original Voices Award for Non-Fiction in 2005 and was short-listed for the Index on Censorship's Freedom of Expression Award 2005. In 2006, the book won the Mainichi Shimbun's Asia Pacific Grand Prix Award.

References

Year of birth missing (living people)
Living people
American women non-fiction writers
21st-century American women